The 2020 GrønlandsBANKEN GM was set to be the 50th edition of the Greenlandic Football Championship. The final round was to be started in Ilulissat on August 10, however the tournament was cancelled due to the COVID-19 pandemic in Greenland.

Qualifying stage

Avannaata

NB Nagdlunguaq-48 qualified for the Final Round as hosts.

Qeqertalik

NB Kugsak-45 withdrew before the tournament.

Qeqqata

Sermersooq
B-67 Nuuk and Inuit Timersoqatigiiffiat-79 qualified for the Final Round.

Kujalleq

Final Round
The Final Round was cancelled due to the COVID-19 pandemic in Greenland.

See also
Football in Greenland
Football Association of Greenland
Greenland national football team
Greenlandic Men's Football Championship

References

Foot
Greenlandic Football Championship, 2020